{{{}#invoke:Unsubst||date=|$B=}}
Turquel is a civil parish in the municipality of Alcobaça, Portugal. The population in 2011 was of 4,561 people, in 2021 it was down to 4,439.

References

{{|safesubst:}}

Freguesias of Alcobaça, Portugal